Napoleon at St. Helena may refer to:

 Napoleon at Saint Helena a 1929 German film directed by Lupu Pick
 an alternative name for Forty Thieves (card game)